Beverly Breckenridge is a musician, composer, and actress from Toronto, Ontario. She played bass for the bands Fifth Column and Phono-Comb.

In 1986, Beverly Breckenridge joined the post-punk band Fifth Column.

Beverly's first appearance on film was in No Skin Off My Ass, in 1991. In 2012, a documentary film by Kevin Hegge, called She Said Boom: The Story of Fifth Column was released featuring interviews with band members Caroline Azar, G.B. Jones, and Beverly Breckenrige, with commentary on the influence of Fifth Column by Kathleen Hanna, Vaginal Davis and Bruce LaBruce.

Filmography
She Said Boom: The Story of Fifth Column, directed by Kevin Hegge (2012)
She's Real by Lucy Thane, 1996
Donna, video for Fifth Column, directed by Friday Myers, 1994
Airplane On The Highway, video for Bob Wiseman, directed by Caroline Azar, 1994
The Yo-Yo Gang by G.B. Jones, 1992
No Skin Off My Ass by Bruce LaBruce, 1991
Like This, video for Fifth Column, directed by Bruce LaBruce and Fifth Column, 1990

References

External links

Official You Tube channel for Fifth Column

Canadian women guitarists
Canadian punk rock bass guitarists
Women bass guitarists
Musicians from Toronto
Queercore musicians
Year of birth missing (living people)
Living people
Fifth Column (band) members
Women in punk